The Yugoslav Basketball Cup ( / ) was the men's national basketball cup of Yugoslavia between its inauguration 1959 and 2002. It was held in the Socialist Federal Republic of Yugoslavia between 1959 and 1991 and in the Federal Republic of Yugoslavia between 1992 and 2002. In 2002, FR Yugoslavia changed its name to Serbia and Montenegro while the cup got renamed to the Radivoj Korać Cup.

Nowadays, a similar competition, in the format of a supercup, exists as the ABA League Supercup.

Title holders

 1959 ŽKK Ljubljana
 1960 OKK Beograd
 1961 Not held
 1962 OKK Beograd
 1962–68 Not held
 1968–69 Lokomotiva
 1969–70 Zadar
 1970–71 Crvena zvezda
 1971–72 Jugoplastika
 1972–73 Crvena zvezda
 1973–74 Jugoplastika
 1974–75 Crvena zvezda
 1975–76 Radnički Belgrade
 1976–77 Jugoplastika
 1977–78 Bosna
 1978–79 Partizan
 1979–80 Cibona
 1980–81 Cibona
 1981–82 Cibona
 1982–83 Cibona
 1983–84 Bosna
 1984–85 Cibona
 1985–86 Cibona
 1986–87 IMT
 1987–88 Cibona
 1988–89 Partizan
 1989–90 Jugoplastika
 1990–91 POP 84
 1991–92 Partizan
 1992–93 OKK Beograd
 1993–94 Partizan
 1994–95 Partizan
 1995–96 Budućnost
 1996–97 FMP
 1997–98 Budućnost
 1998–99 Partizan
 1999–00 Partizan
 2000–01 Budućnost
 2001–02 Partizan ICN

The finals

Performance by club

SFR Yugoslavia (1959–1960, 1962, 1968–1991)

FR Yugoslavia (1992–2002)

See also
 Yugoslav Basketball Super Cup
 Yugoslav First Basketball League
 Yugoslav 1. B Federal Basketball League
 YUBA League
 Radivoj Korać Cup
 Adriatic League
 Adriatic League Supercup

References

External links
History of Yugoslavian Cup 

Basketball competitions in Yugoslavia
Basketball competitions in Serbia and Montenegro
Defunct basketball cup competitions in Europe
Recurring sporting events established in 1959
1959 establishments in Yugoslavia
2002 disestablishments in Yugoslavia
Recurring sporting events disestablished in 2002